The King's School is a British grammar school with academy status, in the market town of Grantham, Lincolnshire, England. The school's history can be traced to 1329, and was re-endowed by Richard Foxe in 1528. Located on Brook Street, the school's site has expanded over the course of its history, with some school buildings dating back to 1497.

Today, King's remains an all-boys grammar school, with just over 1,000 pupils. King's and another Grantham grammar school, Kesteven and Grantham Girls' School, share teaching resources for sixth form study in certain subjects; since 2006–2007, timetables for this study have been co-ordinated between both schools.

King's boys generally take ten to eleven General Certificate of Secondary Education (GCSE) examinations in Year Eleven (aged 15–16), and they have a choice of three or four A-levels in the sixth form. An Office for Standards in Education, Children's Services and Skills (Ofsted) inspection in May 2008 graded The King's School as "outstanding". The majority of students go on to higher education following the completion of their A-levels at the end of Year Thirteen (aged 17–18), and it is common for several boys to gain Oxbridge offers.

History

The King's School has an unbroken history on the same site since its re-endowment in 1528 by Richard Foxe, although its history can be traced back to 1329. Sir Nikolaus Pevsner in his Buildings of England, dates the original School building to 1497. Foxe was born and raised locally. He entered into the service of Henry Tudor, while Henry was in exile in Brittany. When Henry took the throne of England as Henry VII, Foxe became his secretary, and later founded Corpus Christi College, Oxford (1517) and Taunton Grammar School (1522). In the 16th century the School became known as the Free Grammar School of King Edward VI. Scholars numbered perhaps a few dozen at foundation, and there were still fewer than one hundred until the 20th century.

Isaac Newton was a King's School scholar between 1655 and 1660. As was customary in his time, he carved his signature on the wall of what is now the school library, although the signature has never been confirmed as authentic; visitors from around the world come to view this indication of Newton's education. A replica of the signature is on display in Grantham Museum.

The school became a selective state grammar school under the implementation of the 1944 Education Act. By 1970, Kesteven County Council announced plans to turn its grammar schools into co-educational comprehensives for ages of 11–16 and leave Grantham College as the town's only sixth form. Other parts of Kesteven became comprehensive but responsibility for education passed to Lincolnshire County Council under the Local Government Act 1972, and King's remained a grammar school.

On 1 August 2011 The King's School ended its long relationship with the local elected authorities and the town of Grantham, by converting to a selective academy. It remains a selective boys' school and has kept its name and logo.

The novelist and eccentric Frederick Rolfe ('Baron Corvo') was briefly a teacher at the school.

In 1988 an illustrated history of the School was published by a former King's School teacher:  The King's School Grantham – 660 years of a Grammar School.

Notable former pupils

Early scholars

William Cecil (statesman) (1530s);
Henry More (philosopher) (ca.1620s);
Isaac Newton (scientist) (1655–1659);
Colley Cibber (playwright and poetaster) (1682–1687).

20th century scholars

 Captain Albert Ball VC DSO MC (World War I Flying Ace)
 Air Vice Marshal Gary Waterfall CBE (Senior RAF Officer, Chief of Staff (Operations) Permanent Joint Headquarters)
 Jason Lai (Orchestral Conductor and TV Presenter)
 Andy Bond, Former Asda COO
 Andy Clarke, Former Asda CEO
 Brian Thompson (1938-2011), footballer and concert promoter
 Ben Everitt (1978-), MP for Milton Keynes North.

References

External links

 The King's School, Grantham
 The King's School Old Boys' Society

Educational institutions established in the 1520s
Grammar schools in Lincolnshire
1528 establishments in England
Boys' schools in Lincolnshire
Schools in Grantham
Academies in Lincolnshire